Vacuum column may refer to
 A device used in vacuum distillation
 A feature of a tape drive that serves as a low-inertia magnetic tape buffer: 9-track tape#Typical operation; Tape drive#Technical problems